Legal pluralism is the existence of multiple legal systems within one society and/or geographical area. Plural legal systems are particularly prevalent in former colonies, where the law of a former colonial authority may exist alongside more traditional legal systems (customary law). In postcolonial societies a recognition of pluralism may be viewed as a roadblock to nation-building and development. Anthropologists view legal pluralism in the light of historical struggles over sovereignty, nationhood and legitimacy.

History 
When the systems developed, the idea was that certain issues (such as commercial transactions) would be covered by colonial law, and other issues (family and marriage) would be covered by traditional law. Over time, those distinctions tended to break down, and individuals would choose to bring their legal claims under the system that they thought would offer them the best advantage.

Current practice 
Legal pluralism also occurs when different laws govern different groups within a country. For example, in India and Tanzania, there are special Islamic courts that address concerns in Muslim communities by following Islamic law principles. Secular courts deal with the issues of other communities.

Since modern Western legal systems can also be pluralistic, it is misleading to discuss legal pluralism only in relation to non-Western legal systems. Legal pluralism may even be found in settings that might initially appear legally homogenous. For example, there are dual ideologies of law within courthouses in the US, as the formal ideology of law as it is written exists alongside the informal ideology of law as it is used. The discussion on the internal and external plurality of legal systems is called sociology of law.

Sources of Islamic law include the Koran, Sunnah and Ijma, but most modern Western nation-states take the basis of their legal system from the Christian superpowers of old (Britain, France etc.). That is also why moral laws found in the Bible have actually been made full-fledged laws, with the initial grundnorm set far back in legal history, hence fulfilling the priority of both the positivists and the naturalists. The Oriental net Hamed Kazemzadeh believes that in spite of the levelling off of many present differences under the impact of science, technology, and increased intercommunication in Legal Pluralism, we cannot in any reasonably near future envisage any substantial lessening of the differences in our basic value systems, either philosophical or cultural.

Legal pluralism also exists to an extent in societies where the legal systems of the indigenous population have been given some recognition. In Australia, for example, the Mabo decision gave recognition to native title and thus elements of traditional Aboriginal law. Elements of traditional aboriginal criminal law have also been recognised, especially in sentencing. That has, in effect, set up two parallel sentencing systems. Another example is the Philippines whose customary ways of indigenous peoples in the Cordilleras are recognized by the Philippine government and in Kalinga, Bodong is the means used by the people to settle disputes: since it had been very effective for them, it is still widely practiced.

There is some concern that traditional legal systems and Muslim legal systems fail to promote women's rights. As a consequence, members of the Committee on the Elimination of Discrimination against Women (CEDAW) have called for a unification of legal systems within countries.

In the Theory of Law 
In legal anthropology and sociology, following research that noted that much social interaction is determined by rules outside of the law and that several such "legal orders" could exist in one country, John Griffiths, made a strong argument for the study of these social systems of rules and how they interact with the law itself, which came to be known as legal pluralism.

This concept of legal pluralism where the law is seen as one of many legal orders has been criticized. Roberts argued that the concept of law was intrinsically linked to the notion of the state so these legal orders should not be considered similar to law. On the other hand, Tamanaha and Griffiths have argued that law should only be studied as a particular form of social order together with other rules that govern social systems, abandoning the concept of law as something worth studying.

See also 

 Customary law
 International customary law
 Journal of Legal Pluralism
 Legal dualism
 List of national legal systems
 Polycentric law
 Sociology of law

References

Further reading 

 Barzilai, Gad. 2003. Communities and Law: Politics and Cultures of Legal Identities University of Michigan Press 
 Benda-Beckmann, K. von. 1981. “Forum Shopping and Shopping Forums: Dispute Processing in Minangkabau Village.” Journal of Legal Pluralism 19: 117-159.
 Channock, M. 1985. Law, Custom, and Social Order: The Colonial Experience in Malawi and Zambia. New York: Cambridge University Press.
 Merry, Sally Engle. 1988. “Legal Pluralism.”  Law & Society Review 22: 869-896
 Sierra, Maria Teresa. 1995. “Indian Rights and Customary Law in Mexico: A Study of the Nahuas in the Sierra de Puebla.” Law & Society Review 29(2):227-254.
 Speelman, G. 1995. “Muslim Minorities and Shari’ah in Europe”. Pp. 70–77 in Tarek Mitri (Ed.), Religion, Law and Society. Geneva, Switzerland: World Council of Churches.
 Kazemzadeh, H. 2018. “Pluralism in Ideological Peacebuilding”, .
 Starr, June, and Jonathan Pool. 1974. "The Impact of a Legal Revolution in Rural Turkey."  Law & Society Review: 533-560.
 Tamanaha, Brian Z., Caroline Sage, and Michael Woolcock, eds. 2012. Legal Pluralism and Development: Scholars and Practitioners in Dialogue. Cambridge, UK: Cambridge University Press. 
 Tamanaha, Brian Z. 2021. Legal Pluralism Explained: History, Theory, Consequences. New York: Oxford University Press.

External links
 McGill Centre for Human Rights and Legal Pluralism, Faculty of Law 

 
Multiculturalism
Theories of law